Corybas longipetalus (Ridl.) Schltr. is a species of flowering plant in the family Orchidaceae, native to New Guinea. It was first described by Henry Nicholas Ridley in 1916 as Corysanthes longipetala.

References

longipetalus
Flora of New Guinea
Plants described in 1916